General Lucio V. Mansilla is a settlement in northern Argentina. It is located in Formosa Province. It is named after the General Lucio V. Mansilla.

Populated places in Formosa Province